1,8-Cineole,NADPH:oxygen oxidoreductase may refer to:

 1,8-Cineole 2-endo-monooxygenase
 1,8-Cineole 2-exo-monooxygenase